Indovina chi viene a merenda? (i.e. "Guess who's coming to tea?") is a 1969 Italian war-comedy film written and directed by Marcello Ciorciolini and starring the comic duo Franco and Ciccio.

Plot
Sicily 1943: to avoid war, Franco and Ciccio hid in the mountains. Two American paratroopers steal their clothes and leave them their uniforms in exchange, so our "heroes" are captured by the Germans and deported to Germany. They will escape, take refuge on a farm and be the protagonists of chain misadventures. After the war, believed dead, they are safe and sound up there in Germany.

Cast 

Franco Franchi as Franco La Rapa
Ciccio Ingrassia as  Ciccio La Rapa
Mimmo Palmara as  Comm. Tiger
Carlo Romano as  Otto Bauer
Giacomo Rossi Stuart as  Camp Commandant
 Jon Chevron as Cpt. Sidney
Toni Ucci as Commander of the Paratroopers
 Laetitia Le Hir as  Martha Bauer	
 Ivana Novak as  Annelore Bauer
Ignazio Leone as Mayor of Montefriddu 
Lino Banfi as Owl Man
Luigi Bonos as German Soldier

References

External links

1969 comedy films
1969 films
Films directed by Marcello Ciorciolini
Italian comedy films
Italian World War II films
1960s Italian-language films
1960s Italian films